MVB may refer to:
Martin Van Buren (1782-1862), eighth president of the United States
Mark van Bommel (b. 1977), Dutch football player
Marco van Basten (b. 1964), Dutch football player
Multivesicular body, a specialized endosome which itself contains internal vesicles
Multifunction Vehicle Bus, a data line used in train control systems
Bachelor of Veterinary Medicine (MVB) degree awarded by University College Dublin
Magdeburger Verkehrsbetriebe (MVB)
My Vision Born, (MyVisionBorn Foundation / MVB Records) (MVB) acronym meaning, record label, and non-profit organization started by Abdel Russell